Bourdonnay is a commune in the Moselle department in Grand Est in northeastern France.

Geography 
The commune is part of the Lorraine Regional Natural Park.

The Canal des Salines rises in the municipality and flows into the Seille, on the border with Marsal and Moyenvic, after passing through eight municipalities.

Toponymy 
Previous Names: Bordoneis (1175), Portenach (14th century), Bortnach (1455-1469), Bortnachen (1460), Borthenachen (1461).

History 
This former seigneury of the Counts of Réchicourt depended on the Bishopric of Metz. The village was completely destroyed during the Thirty Years' War and was not rebuilt until the beginning of the 18th century.

Population

See also 
 Communes of the Moselle department
 Parc naturel régional de Lorraine

References

External links 
 

Communes of Moselle (department)